The Permanent Representative of Colombia to the United Nations  is the Permanent Representative of the Republic of Colombia to the United Nations, accredited as Concurrent Non-Resident Ambassador to the Republic of Kosovo, and Montenegro.

The Permanent Representative is Colombia's foremost diplomatic representative to UN, and Chief of Mission in New York City. The Permanent Representative however, is not the only high-ranking Colombian diplomat in the United States, the other two being the Permanent Representative of Colombia to the Organization of American States in Washington, D.C., and the Ambassador of Colombia to the United States, also in Washington D.C. The officeholder is charged with representing the interests of the President and Government of Colombia, and advancing the relations between Colombia and the general world community.

List of Permanent Representatives
The following is a chronological list of those who have held the office:

References

 
Colombia